The 1916 Western State Normal Hilltoppers football team represented Western State Normal School (later renamed Western Michigan University) as an independent during the 1916 college football season.  In their 10th season under head coach William H. Spaulding, the Hilltoppers compiled a 5–1 record and outscored their opponents, 389 to 38. The 389 points scored by the 1916 team was the highest single season point total for a Western Michigan football team until the 2011 team scored 459 points. Quarterback Scott Burke was the 1916 team captain.

Schedule

References

Western State Normal
Western Michigan Broncos football seasons
Western State Normal Hilltoppers football